Muhamed Subašić (born 19 March 1988) is a Bosnian-Herzegovinian footballer who currently plays for Union Ostermiething in the Landesliga West as a left back.

Club career 
Subašić and his family moved to Germany during the Bosnian War. His only club in Germany was lower league side Rielasingen-Arlen. He returned to Bosnia where he played for Omladinac and NK Podgrmeč in lower leagues, before making his debut in the top division in 2008 for FK Laktaši. After an impressive season with Laktaši, he signed for big spenders Olimpic Sarajevo in the summer of 2009.

On 30 August 2011, Subašić was loaned to Dynamo Dresden until 30 June 2012. He was to be loaned out to Dynamo Dresden again, this time until the summer of 2014-15, however it was cancelled and Subasic returned to Bosnia temporarily to be loaned out to Belgian team OH Leuven.

International career 
After being a part of the Bosnian U-21 side in the qualifications for the 2011 UEFA European Under-21 Football Championship, he received his first call-up for the senior team in September 2010 for a qualifying match against Albania.

On 17 November 2010, he made his debut against Slovakia in a friendly game in Bratislava. He earned a total of 3 caps, scoring 1 goal and his final international was a February 2011 friendly match against Mexico.

Personal life 
Subasic is an electrical engineer and a practicing Muslim. He got married in 2012 and lives in Dresden, Germany.

International goals

References

External links

1988 births
Living people
People from Una-Sana Canton
Bosnia and Herzegovina Muslims
Association football defenders
Bosnia and Herzegovina footballers
Bosnia and Herzegovina international footballers
FK Laktaši players
FK Olimpik players
Dynamo Dresden players
Oud-Heverlee Leuven players
SV Wacker Burghausen players
Premier League of Bosnia and Herzegovina players
2. Bundesliga players
Belgian Pro League players
Regionalliga players
Austrian 2. Landesliga players
Bosnia and Herzegovina expatriate footballers
Expatriate footballers in Germany
Bosnia and Herzegovina expatriate sportspeople in Germany
Expatriate footballers in Belgium
Bosnia and Herzegovina expatriate sportspeople in Belgium
Expatriate footballers in Austria
Bosnia and Herzegovina expatriate sportspeople in Austria